Katherina may refer to:

Katharina Bellowitsch
Katherine Hadford
Susanne Langer

In literature:
Katherina Minola, primary character in the Shakespeare play The Taming of the Shrew.

See also
Catherina (disambiguation)